Bala Hijam (Meitei pronunciation: /ba-lā hī-jam/) is an Indian actress, who predominantly appears in Manipuri films.  Besides this, she has also acted in one Malayalam thriller road film, titled Neelakasham Pachakadal Chuvanna Bhoomi. She is recognized as one of the most successful actresses of Manipur.

Career
Hijam made her film debut at age 15 in Oken Amakcham's Tellanga Mamei, a Manipuri film through the cinematographer of the movie Irom Maipak. She started shooting for her Bollywood debut Zindagi on the Rocks but was left incomplete due to some issues. Her notable role after her first film was in Romi Meitei's Khangdreda Nongdamba, where she played a supporting role alongside Kamala Saikhom. Panthungee Wangmada, directed by Yoimayai Mongsaba produced under the banner Fly High Films is her first film in a lead role. Among her popular films, Yaiskulgee Pakhang Angaoba, Manipur Express, Meerang Mahum, Amukta Ani, Delhi Mellei, Sanagi Tangbal and Thabaton 2 may be mentioned.

Hijam played the role of a differently abled lady in the movie Tamoyaigee Ebecha. In Tamthiba alias Nungshiba, she played the role of a journalist. Her role of Majaru in the movie Yaiskulgee Pakhang Angaoba was well received by the audiences. It also earned her a Manipur State Film Award for Best Actress. She played a cancer patient in the film Panthungee Wangmada.

She also acted in music videos, among which Penna Teibiro, Ngaikhisi and Bullet Bullet are popular numbers.

Accolades
Bala Hijam won the Best Actress Award in 8th Manipur State Film Festival, 2013 for the film Yaiskulgee Pakhang Angaoba. She played the role of Majaru in the film. She has also won the Special Jury Award 2011 from Film Academy Manipur (FAM). She won the Best Actor Award in a Supporting Role - Female for her role Langlen in the film Chinglen Sana in the 11th Manipuri State Film Awards 2018. For her titular role in the film Inamma, she won the Best Actress Award in 9th MANIFA 2020.

Selected filmography

References

External links

 
 

Living people
1992 births
Meitei people
Indian film actresses
People from Imphal West district
Actresses from Manipur
Actresses in Meitei cinema
Actresses in Malayalam cinema
21st-century Indian actresses